He Bingyan  (5 February 1913 – 1 July 1960) was a general in the People's Liberation Army of the People's Republic of China from Hubei.  He was known as the “one-armed General (独臂将军)” for his injuries suffered during the Long March.

Biography

Early life 
He Bingyan was born into a widowed family. After his mother's death, he changed his surname from “Hu” to “He”, the surname of his father.  As a youth, he did many odd jobs, including being a porter, tailor and blacksmith. In 1929, he followed his father and joined the Chinese Workers' and Peasants' Red Army and was part of He Long’s security detail. He joined the Chinese Communist Party in June 1930. Upon graduation from the Hunan Hebei Red Army School in 1932, he was as the captain of an infantry brigade. He took part in the 4th Encirclement Campaign  and was commended as the “model brigade” for assisting the 8th Division to break out of the Nationalist encirclement in Jiangxi Soviet.

In October 1932, He Bingyan led the 3rd Red Army out of the Nationalist Encirclement. However, due to the internal “revisionist” purges in 1933, he was jailed for a brief amount of time before being released by He Long.  After his release, he was appointed as the Chief of the Recruit Brigade. In the same year, his father, He Xuewen died in battle at Hefeng County.

In November 1935, he was named as the Commander of the 5th Division in the 2nd Red Army to lead the forces in the Long March. During a battle in Suining County, Hunan, He Bingyan was hit by a bullet in the arm which was amputated without anesthetic. After rendezvous with the main army forces, he was sent to Xi'an Guangren Hospital for treatment.

During the Second Sino-Japanese War 
Following the outbreak of war, he was the commander of the 358th Brigade of He Long's 120th Division in the Eighth Route Army. He initially led it in skirmishes and guerrilla attacks, like the Ambush of Yanmen Pass on 18–21 October 1937, during the Battle of Xinkou in northern Shanxi. In December 1938, he served as a detachment leader in the 120th Division, actively working with Political Commissar Yu Qiuli to expand the army's area of influence across the northern banks of the Qing River. In winter, He Bingyan led a detachment into Jizhong and successively conducted battles in Lianzikou and Bei Biaoqiao, smashing a 3-way encirclement by the Japanese army.

In 1940, He Bingyan was ordered to return to Jin Sui to participate in the Hundred Regiments Battle. He was subsequently appointed as the deputy commander of the 358th Brigade. He was then transferred to Yan’an for studies at Central Party School of the Communist Party of China. In November 1944, he was ordered to incite and establish  an anti-Japanese base in Honghu and serve as the commander of the 3rd Division of the New Fourth Army in, Hubei, Henan and Jiangxi provinces.

After the founding of the PRC 
After the founding of the People's Republic of China He Bingyan became plagued with ill health and received long-term treatment. He had lost his right arm, had received 11 injuries, 16 scars and suffered from high blood pressure, arthritis, bronchial asthma and kidney disease. Despite these illnesses, he continued to work in the Chinese army. In 1955 he was awarded the rank of general. Five years later, on 1 July 1960, He Bingyan passed away in Chengdu.

References 

1913 births
1960 deaths
Chinese revolutionaries
People of the Chinese Civil War
People from Yichang
People's Liberation Army generals from Hubei